"Baby" is a single by Swedish rock band, Royal Republic. It is the second single off of their third studio album, Weekend Man. The single was released, along with its music video on 15 January 2016.

The single was the first song by the band to chart, and the first work of theirs to chart in the United States. "Baby" reached number 15 in the U.S. Mainstream Rock charts and number 38 in the Rock Airplay charts in September 2017.

Critical reception 
In a staff article for KDOT, they described the track as having "a a distinctly 70’s rock sound that was common right before the big hair movement".

Music video 
A music video for the single was also released on 15 January 2016. The video features the band performing at a roller disco. In an interview with Louder Sound, the band described the music video as "super speed roller disco thunder show".

Live performances 
The band first recorded a live version of the track on 3 June 2016 at Crypt Studio in London.

Charts

References

External links 
 
 

2016 singles
2016 songs
Capitol Records singles
Spinefarm Records singles
Royal Republic songs